Solar power in Yemen includes a 3 kW solar power plant with batteries being developed in Aden.

A company started by students developed solar fans and lamps which can provide light for 6 to 12 hours.

A desalination project has been proposed to provide fresh water to Sana'a. A concentrated solar power plant would produce 10,000 GWh/year, and about one third would be used to provide desalination, and the remainder would be used for pumping. The working fluid would be sea water.

Power crisis 
With the start of the civil war, solar panels found their way into the country fast. On March 23, 2015, Sanaa experienced a major power outage. The Marib power plant, which supplies Yemeni cities with energy, went out of service. Consequently, the generator business flourished for a while. However, due to the unstable conditions in Yemen, generators were not guaranteed to remain functional at all times because of increasing fuel prices and occasional lack of fuel. Yemenis were thus left with the option of solar energy.

See also
Photovoltaics
Solar power in Africa
Yemen

References